China Southwest Airlines Flight 4509 (SZ4509) was a domestic flight in China from Chengdu Shuangliu International Airport, Sichuan to Wenzhou Yongqiang Airport, Zhejiang. On February 24, 1999, the Tupolev Tu-154M operating the flight crashed while on approach to Wenzhou Airport, killing all 61 passengers and crew members on board.

Aircraft and crew 
The aircraft was a 1990-built Tupolev Tu-154M (serial number 90A-846, serial 0846) airliner powered by three Soloviev D-30 turbofan engines from UEC Saturn. It was initially registered in the Soviet Union as CCCP-85846. It was delivered to the Civil Aviation Administration of China (CAAC) in April the same year, and was registered as B-2622.

The flight crew consisted of captain Yao Fuchen, first officer Xue Mao, navigator Lan Zhangfeng, and flight engineer Guo Shuming. There were also seven flight attendants on board.

Accident 
On 24 February 1999, the crew was preparing the aircraft for landing at Wenzhou Airport. All 61 people on board were killed. Several people on the ground were injured from debris.

Cause 
Incorrect self-locking locknuts had been installed in the elevator operating system, which maintenance crews failed to notice. These spun off during the flight, leaving the elevator uncontrollable. This disabled the aircraft pitch channel, causing the crash.

Aftermath 
This and the China Northwest Airlines Flight 2303 disaster contributed to the decision to remove all Tupolev Tu-154 aircraft in China from service on October 30, 2002.

See also
Alaska Airlines Flight 261
China Northwest Airlines Flight 2303
China Southwest Airlines Flight 4146
Japan Airlines Flight 123
Emery Worldwide Airlines Flight 17, a crash where a maintenance error led to an elevator jam and loss of pitch control.
Continental Express Flight 2574, an accident where a deicing boot detached from an elevator due to faulty maintenance, leading to a catastrophic loss of control.

References

Airliner accidents and incidents caused by maintenance errors
Aviation accidents and incidents in 1999
Aviation accidents and incidents in China
Accidents and incidents involving the Tupolev Tu-154
China Southwest Airlines accidents and incidents
1999 disasters in China
History of Zhejiang
February 1999 events in Asia